The Comorian Union for Progress (Comorian: Udzima, lit.

History
In 1978, French mercenary Bob Denard staged a coup d'etat against the socialist government of Ali Soilih, bringing Ahmed Abdallah back to power. In February 1982, Abdallah banned all existing political parties and created the UCP. In subsequent elections a month later, the UCP won 37 of 38 seats in the National Assembly, with the other seat going to an independent. In the 1987 parliamentary elections the UCP won all 42 seats. Another coup by Denard in 1989 brought Said Mohamed Djohar, who was also part of the UCP.

Multi-party politics was introduced in 1990 and Djohar was elected President. However, Djohar renounced the party in 1991. The party boycotted the 1992 parliamentary elections in protest at the government's refusal to update the voter roll. However, it did contest the early elections the following year, winning two seats.

The party was dissolved in October 1996 when it merged into the National Rally for Development.

However, the party was later reformed, and contested the 2015 parliamentary elections, failing to win a seat. It nominated Said Ahmed Said Ali as its candidate for the 2016 presidential elections, but he failed to progress beyond the Grande Comore primary, only receiving 0.5% of the vote.

Electoral history

Presidential elections

Assembly elections

References 

Nationalist parties in Africa
Political parties in the Comoros
Parties of one-party systems
Political parties established in 1982
Political parties disestablished in 1996
1982 establishments in the Comoros
1996 disestablishments in the Comoros